The Women's 200m Breaststroke at the 2007 World Aquatics Championships took place on 29 March (prelims & semifinals) and the evening of 30 March (finals) at the Rod Laver Arena in Melbourne, Australia. 55 swimmers were entered in the event, of which 54 swam.

Existing records at the start of the event were:
World Record (WR):  2:20.54, Leisel Jones (Australia), 1 February 2006 in Melbourne, Australia.
Championship Record (CR): 2:21.72, Leisel Jones (Australia), Montreal 2005 (29 July 2005)

Results

Finals

Semifinals

Preliminaries

See also
Swimming at the 2005 World Aquatics Championships – Women's 200 metre breaststroke
Swimming at the 2006 Commonwealth Games - Women's 200 metres breaststroke
Swimming at the 2008 Summer Olympics – Women's 200 metre breaststroke

References

Women's 200m Breaststroke Preliminary results from the 2007 World Championships. Published by OmegaTiming.com (official timer of the '07 Worlds); Retrieved 2009-07-11.
Women's 200m Breaststroke Semifinals results from the 2007 World Championships. Published by OmegaTiming.com (official timer of the '07 Worlds); Retrieved 2009-07-11.
Women's 200m Breaststroke Final results from the 2007 World Championships. Published by OmegaTiming.com (official timer of the '07 Worlds); Retrieved 2009-07-11.

Swimming at the 2007 World Aquatics Championships
2007 in women's swimming